Thomas Gilbert was a British architect who lived from 1706 to 1776. He is best known for designing and building St. George's Church on the Isle of Portland. His architectural design, which he applied to the Church, came from Christopher Wren, to whom he was an apprentice. When he died Thomas Gilbert was buried beneath St George's Church altar.

References

1706 births
1776 deaths
British ecclesiastical architects